Sar Anbar (also Romanized as Sar Anbār; also known as Sar Anbār-e Kāshgelī) is a village in Susan-e Gharbi Rural District, Susan District, Izeh County, Khuzestan Province, Iran. At the 2006 census, its population was 54, in 7 families.

References 

Populated places in Izeh County